This article lists the governors of the regions of Ethiopia, the eleven ethno-linguistically based regional states (plural: kililoch; singular: kilil) and chartered cities (plural: astedader akababiwach; singular: astedader akabibi) of Ethiopia (officially the Federal Democratic Republic of Ethiopia), formed within the system of ethnic federalism. The regions replaced the provinces in 1992 under the Transitional Government, the change which was formalised when the 1995 Constitution came into force.

The governors of the regions are officially styled as Presidents of the Executive Committee or Chief Administrator of the Region .

Regions

Afar

Amhara

Benishangul-Gumuz

Gambela

Harari

Oromia

Sidama

Somali

South West Ethiopia Peoples' Region

Southern Nations, Nationalities, and Peoples'

Tigray

Chartered cities

Addis Ababa

Dire Dawa

See also

Flags and emblems of the regions of Ethiopia
Subdivisions of Ethiopia

References

External links
World Statesmen – Ethiopia (Regional States)

Ethiopia politics-related lists
Lists of Ethiopian people